Mahalchari is an upazila of Khagrachari District in the Division of Chittagong, Bangladesh.

Geography
It has 6,343 households and total area 248.64 km2.

Demographics
As of the 1991 Bangladesh census, Mahalchari has a population of 32,609. Males constitute 52.95% of the population, and females 47.05%. This Upazila's eighteen up population is 16,662. Mahalchari has an average literacy rate of 26.5% (7+ years), and the national average of 32.4% literate.

Administration
Mahalchari Upazila is divided into five union parishads: Kayangghat, Mahalchhari, Maschhari, Mubachhari, and Sindukchhari. The union parishads are subdivided into 13 mauzas and 196 villages.

Upazila Nirbahi Officer (UNO): Priyanka Datta

Upazila Chairman: Bimal Kanti Chakma

Education 

Schools
 APBn Ideal School and College
 Mohalchari Government High School
 Mohalchari Girls High School

College
 Mohalchari Government College

See also
 Upazilas of Bangladesh
 Districts of Bangladesh
 Divisions of Bangladesh

References

Upazilas of Khagrachhari District